Grangegeeth is a townland in County Westmeath, Ireland.

Grangegeeth is one of 8 townlands of the civil parish of Portloman in the barony of Corkaree in the Province of Leinster. The neighbouring townlands are: Mountmurray to the north, Balrath to the south, Piercefield or Templeoran to the south–west and Piercefield to the north–west. The western boundary of the townland is formed by the L1804 local primary road.

In the 1911 census of Ireland there were 4 houses and 12 inhabitants in the townland.

References

External links
Map of Grangegeeth at openstreetmap.org
Grangegeeth at The IreAtlas Townland Data Base
Grangegeeth at Townlands.ie
 Grangegeeth at the Placenames Database of Ireland

Townlands of County Westmeath